Coomandook railway station was located in the town of Coomandook, about 153 kilometres from Adelaide station.

History 
Coomandook station was located between Cooke Plains and Yumali on the Adelaide-Wolseley line, and the line through Coomandook was opened in 1886 as part of the extension from Nairne to Bordertown. The line opened in stages: on 14 March 1883 from Adelaide to Aldgate, on 28 November 1883 to Nairne, on 1 May 1886 to Bordertown and on 19 January 1887 to Serviceton. However, a station at Coomandook was not included as part of the extension until a grant to build the station was made in 1910 and it was opened on 1 May 1912. The original station was replaced with a smaller brick building and platform in later years. This station design was also used at other stations on the Tailem Bend-Wolseley section of the line. The station closed on 31 December 1990 upon cessation of all AN intrastate services in South Australia. It remains in situ but has since been abandoned.

References

External links
Johnny's Pages gallery

Railway stations in South Australia